Cerace ios is a species of moth of the family Tortricidae. It is found on Borneo.

The wingspan is about 45 mm. The forewings are yellow orange, reticulated (a net-like pattern) with ferruginous violet. On the basal half of the wing, the ground colour predominates, with yellow blotches and ferruginous bands and stripes. On the terminal half of the wing and along the dorsum, the yellow colour is reduced to round spots. Here, dark markings predominate. The hindwings are bright yellow orange, but paler at the base.

References

Moths described in 1941
Ceracini